Montenegrin Americans are Americans who are of Montenegrin origin. The figure includes all people affiliated with United States who claim Montenegrin ancestry, both those born in the country and naturalized citizens, as well as those with dual citizenship who affiliate themselves with both countries or cultures. The number of Montenegrin Americans in the United States is unknown, as the Montenegrin community has not been differentiated in the United States Censuses as different from closely related Serbian American and Yugoslav American groups; therefore Montenegrin Americans are likely to identify with those groups.

History

Early period
At the end of the 19th and early 20th centuries, mass migration of Montenegrins into America occurred. It went in groups, but also individually. First of all, young people from the coastal part of Montenegro were leaving: Boka, Pastrovici, the surroundings of Budva, then from Crmnica, Katun nahija, Gragova, Krivosija, Vilusa, so that in a few years the departure would be extended to the region of Niksic, Bjelopavlici, Piva, Zabljak, Moraca and the whole northern part of Montenegro.

The Austro-Hungarian authorities then helped to get as many Montenegrins as possible, especially young men, to go to America to leave as few soldiers as possible in Montenegro who could go to war.

The number of emigrants has grown from year to year. According to the passport book, which was carefully conducted from 1864 to 1914 in  the Kingdom of Montenegro, in the United States, according to Pavel Rovinsky, there were 17 thousand young Montenegrins. This is stated in the "Glas Crnogorca", which was at that time in Cetinje, as well as in the "Slobodna Misao" newspaper in Niksic. Interesting is the fact that in 1903, in the course of five months, from the beginning of August to the end of December, 621 Montenegrins went to America.

With the departure of young people through Atlantic ocean, spontaneously disappeared the first verses that best talked to the desire to get to the far rich country as soon as possible. Many Montenegrins sang a song:
"Ameriko, rosno cvijeće/
nema toga ko te neće/
ni đeteta od tri ljeta/
niti starca od 100 ljeta…"
Ili:
"Ameriko zemljo kleta/
po tebi mi drago šeta/.
Molim brata, molim kuma,
/da mi zajme trista kruna/
da otidem u Čikago,/
pa da vidim moje drago/
kako radi i propada/
i daleko jade jada…"
Ili:
"Navijorče, vrći momke/
da s’ udaju Crnogorke…" "

Communities 
Today, these Montenegrins mainly live in the central and eastern United States, much of which is concentrated in New York City and Chicago, and to a lesser extent in Detroit, and recent arrivals from former Yugoslavia in the Los Angeles area.

Montenegrin Americans are found throughout the state of Alaska. About a quarter of all known Montenegrin Americans live in Anchorage.  Their presence in Alaska dates back to the gold rushes of the early 20th century. A short-lived newspaper entitled Servian Montenegrin was established at the beginning of 1905 in the town of Douglas, near Juneau. According to the U.S. Census Bureau, in 2015, there were   9,486 ethnic Serbs born in "Other Eastern Europe" countries, overwhelmingly Montenegro. According to the 2000 U.S. census, there were 2,339 individuals whose first ancestry was Montenegrin, and 189 whose second ancestry was Montenegrin, 2,528 ethnic Montenegrins overall.

Notable people

Arts and entertainment
Marina Abramović, performance artist
Enisa Nikaj, pop singer, model and songwriter

Literature
Elijah Monte Radlovic
Nikola Petanović, writer and philosopher

Film
Ivan Kraljevic, film director
Milla Jovovich, actress

Politics
Mark Brnovich, Arizona Attorney General
Michael Anthony Stepovich, former governor of Alaska Territory, 1957-1958 (last appointed governor before statehood).
John Butrovich, former Alaska State Senator
John Dapcevich, former Mayor of Sitka, Alaska
Marko Dapcevich, most recent former Mayor of Sitka, Alaska
Susan Marie Brnovich, Arizona Superior Court Judge
George Perazich, humanitarian

Sports

Justin Cobbs, basketball player
Nicholas Delpopolo, Olympic athlete - judo
Gregg Popovich, basketball coach
Mirsad Huseinovic, soccer player
Novo Bojovic, football player
Žarko Čabarkapa, NBA player
Predrag Drobnjak, NBA player
Slavko Vraneš, NBA player
Nikola Mirotić, NBA player
Nikola Peković, NBA player
Nikola Vučević, NBA player
Halil Kanacević, basketball player in Europe

Fictional
Nero Wolfe

See also
Montenegro–United States relations

References

External links
Montenegrins in Alaska
Montenegrin Emigrants in Alaska
Montenegrin Americans celebrating Montenegrin Independence in Chicago
How Montenegrin Citizens Helped U.S. Soldiers
Montenegrin Ohioans
Montenegrin graveyards in Montana

Americans
European-American society
 
Slavic-American society